Zacatepec Chatino is an indigenous Mesoamerican language, one of the Chatino family of the Oto-Manguean languages. It is often referred to as  ChaqF tinyaJ KichenA tziC, Chatino de San Marcos Zacatepec, or Chatino de Zacatepec as it is distinct from other Chatino languages in the region. Zacatepec Chatino is part of the Eastern Chatino languages. It is spoken in the town of San Marcos Zacatepec, a town of approximately 1,000 people and inhabited by an indigenous group known as the Chatino people. The language was once spoken in the village of Juquila, but is now virtually extinct with two surviving speakers in the area (Villard 2015).

Zacatepec Chatino is a highly endangered language as it is spoken by about 300 Chatinos whom are all above 50 years of age.

Classification
Chatino refers to three closely related modern languages; the three being Eastern Chatino, Tataltepec Chatino, and Zenzontepec Chatino of the Zapotecan branch. Zacatepec Chatino falls under the Eastern Chatino branch.

Zacatepec Chatino, being part of Chatino language family, has shallow orthography. It is more conservative than many other varieties of Eastern Chatino as it conserves many non-final unstressed vowels which have been lost in other varieties.

History
Little is known about the history of Zacatepec Chatino but according to Stéphanie Villard who studied and presented her thesis on the language, it has been on a decline for the past 40 years as natives continue to expand their ties with non-Chatino communities. With the help of the Zacatepec Chatino Documentation Project, Villard has uncovered some of the remnants of the language with the help of many natives from the area. The project includes visits in 2005 and 2006 by Hilaria Cruz, Emiliana Cruz, Megan Crowhurst as well as preliminary analysis of tones in H. Cruz y Woodbury in 2006. It also includes intensive work since 2006 by Stéphanie Villard, including 150 hours of audio, a sketch, papers on sandhi and inflection and grammar as well as short visits concentrating on textual documentation, tone, & morphology

Although Spanish is the official language in San Marcos Zacatepec, Oaxaca, many government officials communicate in Zacatepec Chatino. A study conducted by Villard revealed that majority of the younger population are monolingual Spanish speakers.

Geographic distribution
Zacatepec Chatino is only spoken in San Marcos Zacatepec, Oaxaca in the Sierra Madre region of Mexico.

Dialects/Varieties

Since Zacatepec Chatino is unintelligible with other Chatino varieties, it does not have any other dialects or varieties associated with it.

Phonology

Vowels 
Villard (2015) reports that Zacatepec Chatino presents voicing of non-continuant after nasals, vowel harmony, and contrastive nasal vowels. It also lacks labial phonemes and has 4 levels of pitch ranging from low to high. It also presents 15 specific tonal sequences that can define 15 Lexical classes.

Its phonology presents a rich tonal system with a large inventory of phonemic tonal sequences as well as intricate sandhi patterns.

/a/ does not present any restrictions in its distribution. /a/ is pronounced [a] and may be slightly nasalized. Here are some examples:

nǎ [na] thing

pa̋[pa] dad

kwā ́[kwa] already

mpaà ̋ [mba:] godfather

Wyàa̋[bja:] Santos Reyes Nopala, Oaxaca

chǎʔ [t͜ʃaʔ] word

/e/ does not occur after the nasal stop /n/. /e/ can be long in final syllables and short in non final syllables. Here are some examples:

traʔwē ́ [traʔwe] middle

tikèʔ  [tikeʔ] aroused

siyěʔ [sijeʔ] dressed up

tsaʔwě [t͜saʔwe] good

nkyaseʔ [ŋgjaseʔ] it got deflated

nkyanè   [ŋgjanɛ]̃ he/she sprayed it

nkyaʔwè  [ŋgjaʔwe] it got split

/i/ occurs in final as well as non-final syllables of roots followed by a /ʔ/. It is slightly restricted in its distribution. Here are some examples:

pi̋[pi] poult

pìi̋[pi:] fair skinned, pale

lyiʔ̋ [li̻ ʔ] parrot

mpiʔ̋ [mbiʔ] dram

kiiʔ [ki:ʔ] fire

The distribution of /u/ is highly restricted. /u/ in monosyllabic words is rare. /u/ can be long in final syllables but is always short in non-final syllables. Here are some examples:

xǔʔ [ʃuʔ] oldster

chūú [t͜ʃu:] Jesus

sùntū ̋[suntu] issue (from Spa. asunto)

bùrrū ̋[bur̥u] donkey (from Spa. burro)

kuʔwǐ [kuʔwi] drunk

suti [suti] his/her father

tuʔwa [tuʔwa] his/her mouth

/o/ is restricted as well. It does not occur after the nasal stop /n/ and similarly to /u/, /o/ does not occur after the labiovelars /kw/ or /w/. Here are some examples

Tyò ̋ [to̻ ] Pedro

kōō [ko:] fog

yo [jo] guy

yoo [jo:] soil

pìxō ̋[piʃo] peso

Tones

Grammar

Morphology
San Marcos Zacatepec is considered a head-marking language as it is synthetic and analytic. Some functions are the language are mixed; for example, person marking can be signaled through tone contrast and/or nasalization, encliticization, or also by a separate word.

Its verbal morphology features a large inventory of allomorphs of its aspectual morphemes, which makes its verbal paradigms appear extremely irregular.

The sequence classes are “morphological”—some are specialized by part-of-speech, by inflectional category, or loan provenance, while others are open-ended and general.

Syntax
The basic word order is VSO but there are other orders present. Here is an example of the Chatino Language VSO:

Some morphemes, such as the marker "ʔin" have various functions in the grammar as it is a dative marker. The dative marker introduces human direct objects, indirect objects, and also marks alienable possession.

Compounding patterns play an important role and word formation. the use of combinations of 'light nouns’ or semantically poor nouns and semantically rich adjectives (or nouns, although very rarely) is very prolific in the language. Villard provides us with an example of such formations: the light noun nu ‘the one who’, often occurs as a head noun in noun phrases, as in nu kīʔyó 'man''' (the one who is male) or nu kunāʔán'' 'woman' (the one who is female).

Vocabulary
There are 15 lexical tone classes defined by 15 tone sequences. The sequences pertain to any noncompound stem but have different realizations depending on the number of moras in the stem. The sequence classes are “morphological”—some are specialized by part-of-speech, by inflectional category, or loan provenance, while others are open ended and general. Sequence class identity—not tones—determines tonal ablaut behavior and tonal inflectional classes. The progressive aspect is associated with an M tone which generates composed sequences beyond the original 15

References

Bibliography
 
 Villard S. Zacatepec Chatino verb classification and aspect morphology. Archive of the Languages of Latin America. 2010.

External links 
 ELAR archive of Documentation of Zacatepec Chatino language
 Chatino (Zacatepec variety) (Intercontinental Dictionary Series)

Indigenous languages of Mexico
Chatino languages